A referendum, in the Italian legal system is a request directed to the whole electorate to express their view on a determined question. It is the main instrument of direct democracy in Italy.

The Constitution of Italy only provides for four types of legally binding referendums:
A popular referendum, in which the electorate is called to vote on whether they wish to abolish (abrogate) an existing law, either totally or partially.
A constitutional referendum, which can be requested in some cases when a new constitutional law is approved by Parliament. Similarly, a referendum can be requested to confirm the adoption of the Statute of ordinary regions.
An advisory referendum is required to approve the modification of regions, provinces, or municipalities.
A popular referendum on regional laws and regulations may be regulated by regional statutes.

Despite that the constitutional right to hold a popular referendum has existed since adoption of the Constitution in 1948, the necessary legislation detailing the bureaucratic procedures needed to hold them was not adopted until the early 1970s. As a consequence of this, Italy's first popular referendum was not held until 1974, 27 years after the constitution was first approved.

Popular referendums

Requirements
A popular referendum can only be called only at the request of five Regional Councils or 500,000 Italian voters. A popular referendum can only be asked to abolish an existing law (or part of it); a referendum to adopt new legislation is not provided for by the Constitution. Some matters are not subject to popular referendum: tax laws, budget laws, amnesties and pardons, and laws that authorize the ratification of international treaties. While these are the limits expressly stated by the Constitution, the Constitutional Court has identified further limitations.

The petition, which must include the question of the referendum, must be deposited at the Court of Cassation, which is called to examine the validity of the petition. The Constitutional Court of Italy verifies the regularity of signatures (in case the referendum was requested by the voters) and of the question of the referendum. The court has the power to reject it outright. Many fully valid petitions with the necessary 500,000 signatures have never been accepted as referendums precisely for this reason.

If the Court of Cassation judges the petition to be valid, the referendum question must then be evaluated by the Constitutional Court, which is called to judge its admissibility. Unlike the Court of Cassation, which considers the conformity of the petition to ordinary law, the reference for the Constitutional Court's judgment is the Constitution.

If the Constitutional Court deems the referendum admissible, the President of the Republic has to set a date for the vote between April 15 and June 15.

The final hurdle is that the result of the legislative referendum is only valid if at least a majority of all eligible voters go to the polling station and cast their ballot. If this quorum is not met, the referendum is invalid (which, in practice, means the law is not abolished).

Electronic signatures 
The 2021 Italian budget law authorized for the collection of electronic signatures through a government run online platform, managed through the Italian online digital ID system SPID. Although the platform is not online, starting on July 1 2021 citizens have been able to add signatures to referendums through a provisional process.

The new process has been noted for the speed at which it can collect signatures for referendums, with a referendum to decriminalize marijuana collecting 330,000 signatures in three days in due in large part to digital signatures.

Political party use
The political party in Italy that is most closely associated with, and has made most use of, referendums in the last 40 years is the Radical Party led by Marco Pannella. They hold the record for most referendums presented. Despite only receiving around 2.5% of the popular vote in most national elections, the numerous referendums they have proposed over the years have often mobilised the entire Italian political spectrum in support or opposition. They will often use unconventional methods such as prolonged hunger strikes and/or thirst strikes by their leaders to draw attention to their cause. Their largest political battles came in the 1970s and 80's when they successfully campaigned for the right to divorce and the right to abortion.

Other groups have also made use of referendums to raise the profile of their own small political parties or their leaders or to raise awareness of their respective political agendas. Signatures for referendums have been collected by parties across the political spectrum from the Northern League opposing a law on immigration in 1998 (this was ruled as inadmissible by the constitutional court when presented), all the way to the Italy of Values party when leader Antonio Di Pietro collected signatures in 1998 for a change in the electoral law to a full first past the post system. The Italian radical party and the right wing National Alliance were also collecting signatures for the same exact petition on electoral reform at the same time as Di Pietro's party, showing that often parties from vastly different political beliefs will agree on the same themes that they feel should be subject to referendums.

However, often political parties who are even in the same coalition will have very diverse opinions with regard to referendums. A notorious example of this came in 1999 when the right-wing National Alliance, led by Gianfranco Fini, was collecting signatures for two referendums to abolish political party state financing and a change in electoral law to a full first past the post system, while the Italian Radicals and Di Pietro's Italy of Values were also collecting signatures at the same time. Despite spending an enormous amount of manpower and party funds across all of Italy, his main partner in the House of Freedoms coalition, Forza Italia, led by former and soon to be Prime Minister Silvio Berlusconi, offered no political or financial support. When voting for the referendums took place in 2000, Berlusconi almost abstained and said the vote was "mostly pointless" as he would take care of all reforms when he would return to power.

When the House of Liberties coalition returned to power in 2001, Berlusconi did not abolish political party financing and even reintroduced proportional representation into the electoral law. Critics pointed out that these new measures, approved even with the parliamentary votes of Alleanza Nazionale itself, were proof that Fini and his party had made a complete volte-face and abandoned some of their core political reforms in order to stay in power. It was also seen as proof that Fini's influence in the coalition was not as strong as many were led to believe.

Constitutional referendums

Requirements
A constitutional referendum can be requested by 500,000 voters, five regional councils, or one-fifth of the members of a house of parliament when Parliament adopts a constitutional law (including a law to amend the constitution) with an absolute majority in the second vote, but without meeting a two-thirds qualified majority in each house. The referendum must be requested within three months from the publication of the bill in the Official Gazette.

Unlike a popular referendum, a constitutional referendum is confirmatory. This means a "Yes" vote is a vote in support of the constitutional law, whereas a "Yes" in a popular referendum is a vote for abolishing the law. Also unlike popular referendums, constitutional referendums are not subject to a quorum, meaning they are valid regardless of the turnout.

Only three constitutional referendums have ever been held in Italy: in 2001 (in which the constitutional law was approved), in 2006, and in 2016 (in which they were rejected).

Ad hoc referendums
Before the adoption of the Constitution of 1948, a unique referendum (called referendum on the institutional form of the State or institutional referendum in Italian) was held on 2 June 1946, Italians were asked to vote on the future form of government of Italy: retain the monarchy or become a republic. The republic vote won 54.3% to 45.7%.

A special advisory referendum was held in 1989, on the question of transforming the European Communities into a European Union and of allowing the European Parliament to draft a European Constitution. This referendum was made possible by Constitutional Law no. 2 of 3 April 1989, which specifically provided for this referendum to be held.

List of referendums
Overall, Italians have been called on to decide on 72 national referendums: 67 popular referendums, 3 constitutional referendums, and the 2 ad hoc referendums described above. They approved 25 of them, rejected 18, and 28 were declared invalid because of low turnout.

Referendum on the institutional form of the State
1946 Italian institutional referendum - retaining the monarchy of the House of Savoy or establishing a republic - republic victory.

Popular referendums
1974 Italian referendum - abrogation of divorce - rejected
1978 Italian referendums - 2 questions: abrogation of public financing of political parties and of the act that strengthened law enforcement and improved public order reducing civil rights - all rejected
1981 Italian referendums - 5 questions: 2 about abortion (one for increasing and the other for reducing possibilities) and 3 about abrogation of life sentence, of restrictive rules on public order emergency of the 70s and of ability to possess firearms - all rejected
1985 Italian wage referendum - abrogation of cuts on the sliding wage scale - rejected
1987 Italian nuclear power referendum - 5 questions: abrogation of possibilities for Enel to build nuclear power plants abroad, of government grants to municipalities and provinces that host nuclear power plants, of opportunity for the government to build nuclear power plants in a municipality that has opposed, of the law that denied civil liability of judges and of the special judicial treatment of Ministers - all approved
1990 Italian referendums - 3 questions: limitation of hunting, abrogation of hunting in the land of others and of use of pesticides - quorum not met
1991 Italian electoral law referendum - only one preference, rather than multiple, to elect the representatives of the Chamber of Deputies (elected by Proportional Representation), open party lists and multimember constituencies - approved
1993 Italian referendum - 8 questions: decriminalization of the possession of soft drugs, modification of the Senate electoral law (from Proportional Representation to FPTP), of appointments of heads of state banks, of environmental controls, abrogation of public financing of political parties and of certain ministries - all approved
1995 Italian referendum - 12 questions: 4 about liberalization of trade unions, 4 about television service, 2 about deregulation of trade, 1 about justice and 1 about electoral law of municipalities - 5 questions approved, 7 rejected
1997 Italian referendum - 7 questions: abolition of Order of Journalists and Ministry of Agricultural Policies, abrogation of limits on conscientious objection, of hunting in the land of others and of government powers in privatized companies, 2 questions on justice - quorum not met
1999 Italian referendum - full abrogation of Proportional Representation (in 1993 a new electoral system was approved: 75% of the members of both the Houses are elected with FPTP, 25% with Proportional Representation) - quorum not met
2000 Italian referendum - 7 questions: public financing of political parties, full abrogation of Proportional Representation, layoffs, trade unions and 3 questions on judiciary - quorum not met
2003 Italian referendum - 2 questions: layoffs and passage of electrical conduit on private property - quorum not met
2005 Italian fertility laws referendum - 4 questions on abrogation of the rules that prevent some conduct in research on stem cells, artificial insemination and IVF - quorum not met
2009 Italian electoral law referendum - 3 questions on electoral system - quorum not met
2011 Italian referendum - 4 questions: repeal of rules about reliance on private management of water services, return on capital invested in water services, building nuclear power plants in Italy and legitimate impediment of the Prime Minister and Ministers to appear in penal hearings - all approved
2016 Italian oil drilling referendum - repeal of a law that allows gas and oil drilling concessions extracting hydrocarbon within 12 nautical miles of the Italian coast to be prolonged until the exhaustion of the useful life of the fields - quorum not met
2022 Italian referendum - repeal of a law making people convicted ineligible to run for or maintain a political office, limitation of precautionary measures, separation of judiciary functions, introduction of non-judges in judiciary councils, changes to the way members of the Superior Council of the Judiciary are elected - quorum not met

Constitutional referendums
2001 Italian constitutional referendum - increase of regional powers, strengthening decentralization - approved
2006 Italian constitutional referendum - reorganization and increase of regional powers, ending of perfect bicameralism, Senate responsibility only for federal law, Chamber of Deputies responsibility for national powers (e.g. foreign policy, defence and immigration) cut number of the parliamentarians, required a referendum on each constitutional law, more power to the governments and to the Prime Minister, more complex procedures to remove government's confidence, changes to the composition of the Constitutional Court. - rejected
2016 Italian constitutional referendum - amending the Italian Constitution to reform the appointment and powers of the Parliament of Italy, as well as the partition of powers of State, regions, and administrative entities. - rejected
2020 Italian constitutional referendum - reducing the number of eligible members of Parliament from 630 to 400 in the Chamber of Deputies, and from 315 to 200 in the Senate. - approved

Advisory referendum
1989 Italian advisory referendum - non-binding referendum on the European Union - approved

References